Hans Peter Nielsen (born 4 March 1943) is a retired Danish gymnast. He competed at the 1968 Summer Olympics in all artistic gymnastics events with the best achievement of 33rd place on the pommeled horse.

References

1943 births
Living people
Gymnasts at the 1968 Summer Olympics
Olympic gymnasts of Denmark
Danish male artistic gymnasts
People from Esbjerg
Sportspeople from the Region of Southern Denmark